Centerport is a hamlet and census-designated place (CDP) in Suffolk County, New York, United States, on the notably affluent North Shore of Long Island, historically known as the Gold Coast. Formerly known as Little Cow Harbor in about 1700, as Centerport in 1836, and as Centerport after 1895, the name refers to its geographic position midway between the east and west boundaries of the town of Huntington.

As of the 2010 United States Census, the CDP population was 5,508. It is located in the town of Huntington. Huntington and its surrounding hamlets mark the east end of Long Island's renowned "Gold Coast", the name deriving from the traditional wealth and gentility associated with the area. The association dates back to the early twentieth century in which many affluent families built their homes along the north shore of the island. In Centerport, an example of this is the estate of William Kissam Vanderbilt II, otherwise known as Eagles Nest.

Centerport is highly residential, characterized by winding driveways and beachfront hills. As is common among the many beachfront locations on Long Island's North Shore, Centerport has developed a large boating and sailing culture. An important part of this culture is the Centerport Yacht Club, which was founded in 1947 and has served as the social and athletic focal point for the boating community in both Centerport and its surrounding areas. The yacht club sponsors a variety of racing fleets and regattas every year generally beginning in the late spring and ending mid-autumn.

Suydam House, built in 1730, a saltbox house, is one of the oldest surviving houses in Centerport.

Education
Centerport is in the Harborfields Central School District. The schools include Harborfields High School, Oldfield Middle School, T.J. Lahey Elementary School, and Washington Drive Primary School. In the past, the district has received Blue Ribbon awards of excellence.

Geography
Centerport is located at  (40.892848, -73.378007).

Centerport is the site of the estate and Eagle's Nest mansion of William Kissam Vanderbilt II. This  estate now contains the Vanderbilt museum and planetarium.

Camp Alvernia in Centerport was the first Catholic summer camp in the United States, established in 1888.  Camp Alvernia is still in operation, serving over 900 local children aged 3–14 each summer.

Demographics

Demographics for the CDP
As of the census of 2000, there were 5,446 people, 2,022 households, and 1,526 families residing in the CDP. The population density was 2,562.0 per square mile (987.2/km2). There were 2,094 housing units at an average density of 985.1/sq mi (379.6/km2). The racial makeup of the CDP was 97.65% White, 0.22% African American, 0.11% Native American, 1.18% Asian, 0.31% from other races, and 0.53% from two or more races. Hispanic or Latino of any race were 2.15% of the population.

There were 2,022 households, out of which 34.9% had children under the age of 18 living with them, 65.9% were married couples living together, 7.4% had a female householder with no husband present, and 24.5% were non-families. 18.3% of all households were made up of individuals, and 6.8% had someone living alone who was 65 years of age or older. The average household size was 2.68 and the average family size was 3.07.

In the CDP, the population was spread out, with 25.0% under the age of 18, 3.9% from 18 to 24, 30.8% from 25 to 44, 27.8% from 45 to 64, and 12.4% who were 65 years of age or older. The median age was 40 years. For every 100 females, there were 94.3 males. For every 100 females age 18 and over, there were 94.3 males.

In 2000, the median income for a household in the CDP was $160,456, and the median income for a family was $194,908. Males had a median income of over $100,000 versus $54,706 for females. The per capita income for the CDP was $71,763. About 1.6% of families and 2.9% of the population were below the poverty line, including 2.5% of those under age 18 and 9.2% of those aged 65 or over.

The median household income estimate between 2014-2018, in 2018 dollars, was $145,722. The persons in poverty was 3.5%.

In popular culture
 In the Marvel Comics universe, Angel, a member of the X-Men, was born here.

Notable people
 Arthur Dove, artist
 Buzz Feiten, musician
 Gregg Hughes, radio personality
 Sergei Rachmaninoff, Russian composer (spent two summers in Centerport)
 William Kissam Vanderbilt II

See also 
 Camp Alvernia
 Mill Dam Bridge

References

External links
 Centerport Yacht Club
 Centerport Fire Department

 Centerport, New York (United States Census Bureau)

Huntington, New York
Census-designated places in New York (state)
Hamlets in New York (state)
Census-designated places in Suffolk County, New York
Hamlets in Suffolk County, New York
Populated coastal places in New York (state)